Osteogeneiosus militaris, the soldier catfish, is a species of sea catfish found in the Indian and western Pacific Oceans from Pakistan to the Malay Archipelago. It is found in marine, brackish and fresh waters along the coasts. It grows to a length of 35 cm and is commercially caught for human consumption. It has a single pair stiff, sharp, maxillary barbels.

References
 

Ariidae
Catfish of Asia
Fish of the Indian Ocean
Fish of the Pacific Ocean
Marine fish of Southeast Asia
Taxa named by Pieter Bleeker
Monotypic ray-finned fish genera